Marie-Anne Chapdelaine (born 20 March 1962 in Revin) is a French politician, member of the Socialist Party. She was the deputy for Ille-et-Vilaine's 1st constituency in the National Assembly of France from 2012 to 2017, succeeding Jean-Michel Boucheron.

References

1962 births
Living people
Socialist Party (France) politicians
Women members of the National Assembly (France)
Deputies of the 14th National Assembly of the French Fifth Republic
21st-century French women politicians